"Libya, Libya, Libya", also known as "", is the national anthem of Libya since 2011; it was previously the national anthem of the Kingdom of Libya from 1955 to 1969.

History

Kingdom of Libya
"Libya, Libya, Libya" was composed by Mohammed Abdel Wahab in 1951 and was originally the national anthem of the Kingdom of Libya, from its independence in 1951 until 1969 when King Idris I was overthrown by a bloodless coup d'état led by Muammar Gaddafi. The lyrics were written by Al Bashir Al Arebi.

Libyan Arab Republic
In 1969, Muammar Gaddafi adopted the Egyptian anthem "Walla Zaman Ya Selahy" as the national anthem of the newly proclaimed Libyan Arab Republic. It was later changed to the Egyptian military marching song "Allahu Akbar", which remained the anthem of republic, and later, the Great Socialist People's Libyan Arab Jamahiriya, until 2011.

Libyan civil war
In 2011, "Libya, Libya, Libya" was declared as the new national anthem of Libya by the National Transitional Council. "Libya, Libya, Libya" ultimately did become the national anthem of Libya once again, following the Libyan Civil War and the death of Muammar Gaddafi. The verse that glorifies King Idris (shown in italics) has since been discontinued and rewritten to glorify Libyan national hero Omar al-Mukhtar, who spearheaded native Libyan resistance against Italian colonization during the Second Italo-Senussi War.

Lyrics

Current lyrics 
The rewritten third verse is not always sung.

Original third verse (1951–1969)

Tune

See also

 Music of Libya

Notes

References

External links
MP3 version

Libyan music
Libyan monarchy
National symbols of Libya
African anthems
Royal anthems
National anthem compositions in A-flat major
National anthem compositions in F major